DriveNets  is a software company, vendor of a network infrastructure platform 
that runs over a physical infrastructure consisting of  white boxes.

History
DriveNets was founded in 2015  by Ido Susan and Hillel Kobrinsky. Susan is the cofounder of  Intucell, which he sold to Cisco for $475 million in 2013.
Kobrinsky cofounded Interwise, which was acquired by AT&T for $121 million; DriveNets  was in a stealth mode and was  self-funded until 2019. In 2019, DriveNets raised $110 million in  series A round from Bessemer Venture Partners and Pitango Growth, along with John W. Thompson and Stephen J. Luczo. In 2021, DriveNets raised $208 million  in series B funding led by D1 Capital Partners with follow-on investments from Bessemer and Pitango and investment by Harel Insurance. In August 2022, DriveNets announced it completed Series C funding of $262 million led by D2 Investments, along with former investors Bessemer, D1 Capital, Pitango and Atreides Management and Harel Insurance.
The company's estimated value was $2.5 billion,  after raising total sum of $587 million.

The company has 450 employees at offices in Israel, Romania, Japan and USA. 
The company has about 100 customers, including AT&T. and KDDI. Among its  partners are Fujitsu,  Broadcom Inc.,
Itochu Techno-Solutions, Wipro,  KGPCo and EPCglobal.

Technologies
DriveNets markets a scalable network operating system (NOS) based on a cloud. The  network  cloud architecture creates software  routing framework that can grow linearly to a large scale from a centralized cloud.  

The company leverages  Telco-hierarchy cloud design principles such as containerized  microservices, shared facilities and inexpensive white boxes.

Awards
2019 - Globes start-up of the year.
Calcalist  50 Most Promising Israeli Startups 2020 - COVID-19 Edition  
 Vendor Innovation Award at World Communication Awards (WCA) 2019 
 2020 Fierce Innovation Award in the Next Gen Deployment Wireline Category  
 2020 TechTarget Network Innovation Award. 
 Leading Lights 2020 Company of the Year (Private): The Winners by Light Reading  
 2020 Emerging Vendors Details by CRN magazine.
Gartner Cool Vendor in Communications Service Provider Network Operations Category in 2020.  
 Business Insider 47 enterprise startups to bet your career on in 2020  
2021 Leading Lights Award for Best New Optical Networking/IP Product.

See also
List of unicorn startup companies
Science and technology in Israel
Silicon Wadi

References

Software companies established in 2015
2015 establishments in Israel
Software companies of Israel
Cloud computing providers
Routing software